Henry Seymour Kaplan (April 24, 1918 – February 4, 1984) was an American radiologist who pioneered in radiation therapy and radiobiology.

Career
Kaplan earned his degree from Rush Medical College in Chicago, after which he trained at the University of Minnesota, Yale University and the National Cancer Institute. He once said he became interested in oncology after his father died of lung cancer, the same disease which killed Dr. Kaplan, a non-smoker.

Together with Edward Ginzton, he developed the first medical linear accelerator in the United States while he worked at the Stanford University Medical Center of Stanford University. The six million volt machine was first used for treatment in 1956, soon after the earliest linac-based radiation therapy, first used in London, England, in 1953.  
The first patient treated by Kaplan was Gordon Isaacs, who suffered from retinoblastoma of his right eye, and the disease threatened his left eye. The patient survived into adulthood with normal vision in his left eye. His main focus was on Hodgkin's disease, which was fatal before radiation therapy was used.

In 1969, he became the first physician credited with the Atoms for Peace Prize. He was the first radiologist elected to the National Academy of Sciences in 1972. In 1979, he received the Charles F. Kettering Prize from the General Motors Cancer Research Foundation.

References

 Charlotte DeCroes Jacobs. Henry Kaplan and the Story of Hodgkin's Disease (Stanford University Press; 2010) 456 pages; combines a biography of Kaplan with a history of the lymphatic cancer whose treatment he helped to transform.
Lawrence K. Altman Dr. Henry Kaplan, Cancer-Fighter, is Dead. New York Times, February 6, 1984.
Malcolm A. Bagshaw, Henry E. Jones, Robert F. Kallman, Joseph P. Kriss. Memorial Resolution Henry S. Kaplan (1918–1984). Stanford Historical Society. Retrieved December 27, 2008.
Mitzi Baker. Medical linear accelerator celebrates 50 years of treating cancer. Stanford School of Medicine. Retrieved December 27, 2008.

External links

 Charlotte D. Jacobs, "Henry S. Kaplan", Biographical Memoirs of the National Academy of Sciences (2015)

American radiologists
Stanford University School of Medicine faculty
Atoms for Peace Award recipients
1918 births
1984 deaths
Fellows of the American Academy of Arts and Sciences
Members of the United States National Academy of Sciences
Members of the French Academy of Sciences
Deaths from lung cancer
20th-century American physicians
Members of the National Academy of Medicine